Olin is both a surname and a given name.

Notable people named Olin

Surname
 Abram B. Olin (1808–1879), U.S. Representative from New York
 Antero Olin (born 1948), Finnish artist
 Bob Olin (1908–1956), American boxer
 Bob Olin (born 1966) American actor, director, producer
 Charles H. Olin (1867–1914), Canadian politician from the Northwest Territories and Alberta
 Dave Olin (born 1947), Democratic Farmer Labor Party, Minnesota House of Representatives
 Elisabeth Olin (1740–1828), Swedish opera singer
 Elizabeth Olin (born 1988), American actress
 Ferris Olin (born 1948), American feminist scholar
 Franklin W. Olin (1860–1951), American industrialist, founder of the Olin Corporation and creator of the F. W. Olin Foundation
 Gideon Olin (1743–1823), American politician from Vermont
 Henry Olin (1768–1837), American politician from Vermont
 Jim Olin (1920–2006), American politician from Virginia
 Johan Olin (1883–1928), Finnish Olympic wrestler
 John Olin (1886-1920), American professional wrestler
 John M. Olin (1892–1982), Chairman of the Olin Corporation, son of Franklin W. Olin
 Julia Lynch Olin (1882–1961), American author
 Ken Olin (born 1954), American television actor, director and producer
 Kristina Axén Olin (born 1962), Swedish Moderate Party politician
 Laurie Olin (born 1938), American landscape architect
 Lena Olin (born 1955), Swedish actress
 Milo H. Olin (1842–1907), American businessman and politician from new York
 Milton Olin, Jr. (1948–2013), American businessman and former Napster COO
 Mathea Olin (born 2003), Canadian surfer
 Margreth Olin (born 1970), Norwegian film director
 Nahum Olin (born 1957), Mexican race car driver and team owner
 Nelly Olin (1941–2017), French Minister of Environment
 Ralf Olin (1925–2007), American speed skater
 Spencer Truman Olin (1900–1995), American industrialist and philanthropist
 Stephen Olin (1797–1851), American educator and minister
 Stephen Henry Olin (1847–1925), American lawyer and acting president of Wesleyan University
 Steve Olin (1965–1993), American professional baseball player
 Stig Olin (1920–2008), Swedish actor
 Thomas F. Olin (1928–1996), American businessman, Chairman of Archway Cookies
 Thomas F. Olin, Jr. (born before 1990), American businessman, also of Archway Cookies
 Tommy Olin (born 1962), Swedish curler
 William M. Olin (1845–1911), Massachusetts Secretary of the Commonwealth

Given name
 Olin G. Blackwell (1915–1986), American prison warden
 Olin Branstetter (1929–2011), American businessman and politician
 Olin Browne (born 1959), American professional golfer
 Olin Hatfield Chilson (1903–1991), United states federal judge
 Olin Downes (1886–1955), American music critic
 Olin Dows (1904–1981), US Army artist
 Olin Dutra (1901–1983), American professional golfer
 Olin J. Eggen (1919–1998), American astronomer
 Olin Francis (1891-1952), American actor
 Olin Howland (1886–1959), American character actor 
 Olin M. Jeffords (1890–1964), American lawyer from Vermont
 Olin D. Johnston (1896–1965), South Carolina politician
 Olin Kreutz (born 1977), professional football player for the Chicago Bears
 Olin B. Lewis (1861-1936), American politician and educator
 Olin Mott (1921–2013), American businessman
 Olin R. Moyle (1887–1966), American lawyer
 Olin T. Nye (1872–1943), American lawyer, judge, and politician from New York
 Olin Stephen Pace (1891–1970), American politician from Georgia
 Olin Sewall Pettingill Jr. (1907–2001), American ornithologist
 Olin Clyde Robison (1936–2018), president of Middlebury College
 Olin Smith (1900-1966), American football player
 Olin Stephens (1908–2008), American yacht designer
 Olin E. Teague (1910–1981), American politician from Texas
 Olin Levi Warner (1844–1896), American sculptor
 Olin Dunbar Wheeler (1852–1925), American historian and author
 Olin Chaddock Wilson (1909–1994), American astronomer
 Olin Wellborn (1843–1921), American politician from Texas

Middle name
 Alvin Olin King (1890–1958), American politician from Louisiana
 C. Olin Ball (1893–1970), American food scientist
 Deb Olin Unferth (born 1968), American writer
 Erik Olin Wright (1947–2019)), American sociologist
 Floyd Olin Smith (1885–1961), American physician 
 Scott Olin Wright (1923–2016), United States federal judge
 H. Olin Young (1850–1917), American politician from Michigan
 Lawrence Olin Brockway (1907-1979), American chemist
 Lindsey Olin Graham (born 1955), American politician
 Philip Olin Keeney (1891–1962), American librarian accused of being a spy for the Soviet Union
 Topliff Olin Paine (1893–1922), US Army Air Corps pilot
 Vaughn Olin Lang (1927–2014), US Army lieutenant general
 Wilbur Olin Atwater (1844–1907), American chemist
 Wilbur Olin Hedrick (1868–1954), American economist
 William Olin Burgin (1877–1946), American politician from North Carolina
 William Olin Stillman (1856-1924), American physician and medical writer

See also
 W. E. D. Ross (1912-1995), Canadian author who used the pen name "Olin Ross"
 Carmen Mondragón (1893–1978), Mexican artist known as "Nahui Olin"
 Ohlin, a similar Swedish surname

References